Mavilayi is a census town in Kannur district in the Indian state of Kerala.
Situated in Peralasseri Panchayath on Kannur-Kuthuparamba State Highway, 15 km away from Kannur Town.

Demographics
As of 2011  Census, Mavilayi had total population of 12,286 which constitutes 5,593 (45.5%) males and 6,693 (54.5%) females. The male female sex ratio was 1,197 higher than state average of 1,084. 
In Mavilayi, 10.5% of the population is under 6 years of age. Mavilayi had an overall literacy of 96.6% higher than state average of 94%. The male literacy stands at 98.3% and female literacy was 95.3%.

Culture
Maavila Kaavu near Maavilayi is one of the historic temple in Kannur and is famous for annual celebrations of Adiyutsavam - a mock war festival which is related to the story of Daivathar trying to resolve the issue between Mootha kaikor and Ilaya kaikor.

Educational Institutions
Mavilayi Central LP School
Mavilayi LP School
A.K.G Memorial College of Nursing
RDC Mavilayi
Mundayode LP School

Government Offices
Mavilayi Village Office
Sub Post Office, Mavilayi
Veterinary Hospital

Co-Operative Sector
Mavilayi Service Co-Operative Bank
Raidco Curry Powder Unit

Art & Culture
Moithu Memorial Library and Public Reading Room, Mavilayi
Voice of mavilayi Arts & Sports Club, Mavilayi
Rural Development Centre (R D C Mavilayi)
Mundayode Podujana Vayanassala. Mundayode
Navajeevan Vayanasala, Mavilayi
Cheguvera Arts club, Trikkapalam
Victory Arts & Sports Club Cherumavilayi

Transportation
The national highway passes through Thalassery town. Mangalore, Goa and Mumbai can be accessed on the northern side and Cochin and Thiruvananthapuram can be accessed on the southern side.  The road to the east of Iritty connects to Mysore and Bangalore.   The nearest railway station is Thalassery on Mangalore-Palakkad line. 
Trains are available to almost all parts of India subject to advance booking over the internet.  There are airports at Mangalore and Calicut. Both of them are international airports but direct flights are available only to Middle Eastern countries.

See also
 Kannavam
 Pinarayi
 Thrippangottur
 Panoor
 Peravoor
 Kottayam-Malabar
 Mattanur
 Kannur
 Iritty
 Mangattidam
 Pathiriyad
 Manantheri
 Cheruvanchery

References

Villages near Thalassery
Cities and towns in Kannur district